A geomembrane is  very low permeability synthetic membrane liner or barrier used with any geotechnical engineering related material so as to control fluid (liquid or gas) migration in a human-made project, structure, or system.  Geomembranes are made from relatively thin continuous polymeric sheets, but they can also be made from the impregnation of geotextiles with asphalt, elastomer or polymer sprays, or as multilayered bitumen geocomposites.  Continuous polymer sheet geomembranes are, by far, the most common.

Manufacturing
The manufacturing of geomembranes begins with the production of the raw materials, which include the polymer resin, and various additives such as antioxidants, plasticizers, fillers, carbon black, and lubricants (as a processing aid).  These raw materials (i.e., the "formulation") are then processed into sheets of various widths and thickness by extrusion, calendering, and/or spread coating.

Geomembranes dominate the sales of geosynthetic products, at US$1.8 billion per year worldwide, which is 35% of the market. The US market is currently divided between HDPE, LLDPE, fPP, PVC, CSPE-R, EPDM-R and others (such as EIA-R), and can be summarized as follows: (Note that M m2 refers to millions of square meters.)

 high-density polyethylene (HDPE) ~ 35% or 105 M m2
 linear low-density polyethylene (LLDPE) ~ 25% or 75 M m2
 polyvinyl chloride (PVC) ~ 25% or 75 M m2
 flexible polypropylene (fPP) ~ 10% or 30 M m2
 chlorosulfonated polyethylene (CSPE) ~ 2% or 6 M m2
 ethylene propylene diene terpolymer (EPDM) ~ 3% or 9 M m2

The above represents approximately $1.8 billion in worldwide sales.  Projections for future geomembrane usage are strongly dependent on the application and geographical location.  Landfill liners and covers in North America and Europe will probably see modest growth (~ 5%), while in other parts of the world growth could be dramatic (10–15%).  Perhaps the greatest increases will be seen in the containment of coal ash and heap leach mining for precious metal capture.

Properties
The majority of generic geomembrane test methods that are referenced worldwide are by the ASTM International|American Society of Testing and Materials (ASTM) due to their long history in this activity.  More recent are test method developed by the International Organization for Standardization (ISO).  Lastly, the Geosynthetic Research Institute (GRI) has developed test methods that are only for test methods not addressed by ASTM or ISO.  Of course, individual countries and manufacturers often have specific (and sometimes) proprietary test methods.

Physical properties 
The main physical properties of geomembranes in the as-manufactured state are:

 Thickness (smooth sheet, textured, asperity height)
 Density
 Melt flow index
 Mass per unit area (weight)
 Vapor transmission (water and solvent).

Mechanical properties 
There are a number of mechanical tests that have been developed to determine the strength of polymeric sheet materials.  Many have been adopted for use in evaluating geomembranes.  They represent both quality control and design, i.e., index versus performance tests.

 tensile strength and elongation (index, wide width, axisymmetric, and seams)
 tear resistance
 impact resistance
 puncture resistance
 interface shear strength
 anchorage strength
 stress cracking (constant load and single point).

Endurance 
Any phenomenon that causes polymeric chain scission, bond breaking, additive depletion, or extraction within the geomembrane must be considered as compromising to its long-term performance.  There are a number of potential concerns in this regard.  While each is material-specific, the general behavior trend is to cause the geomembrane to become brittle in its stress-strain behavior over time.  There are several mechanical properties to track in monitoring such long term degradation:  the decrease in elongation at failure, the increase in modulus of elasticity, the increase (then decrease) in stress at failure (i.e., strength), and the general loss of ductility.  Obviously, many of the physical and mechanical properties could be used to monitor the polymeric degradation process.

 ultraviolet light exposure (laboratory of field)
 radioactive degradation
 biological degradation (animals, fungi or bacteria)
 chemical degradation
 thermal behavior (hot or cold)
 oxidative degradation.

Lifetime 
Geomembranes degrade slowly enough that their lifetime behavior is as yet uncharted.  Thus, accelerated testing, either by high stress, elevated temperatures and/or aggressive liquids, is the only way to determine how the material will behave long-term.  Lifetime prediction methods use the following means of interpreting the data:

 Stress limit testing:  A method by the HDPE pipe industry in the United States for determining the value of hydrostatic design basis stress.
 Rate process method:  Used in Europe for pipes and geomembranes, the method yields similar results as stress limit testing.
 Hoechst multiparameter approach:  A method that utilizes biaxial stresses and stress relaxation for lifetime prediction and can include seams as well.
 Arrhenius modeling:  A method for testing geomembranes (and other geosynthetics) described in Koerner for both buried and exposed conditions.

Seaming

The fundamental mechanism of seaming polymeric geomembrane sheets together is to temporarily reorganize the polymer structure (by melting or softening) of the two opposing surfaces to be joined in a controlled manner that, after the application of pressure, results in the two sheets being bonded together.  This reorganization results from an input of energy that originates from either thermal or chemical processes.  These processes may involve the addition of additional polymer in the area to be bonded.

Ideally, seaming two geomembrane sheets should result in no net loss of tensile strength across the two sheets, and the joined sheets should perform as one single geomembrane sheet.  However, due to stress concentrations resulting from the seam geometry, current seaming techniques may result in minor tensile strength and/or elongation loss relative to the parent sheet.  The characteristics of the seamed area are a function of the type of geomembrane and the seaming technique used.

Applications

Geomembranes have been used in the following environmental, geotechnical, hydraulic, transportation, and private development applications:

 As liners for potable water
 As liners for reserve water (e.g., safe shutdown of nuclear facilities)
 As liners for waste liquids (e.g., sewage sludge)
 Liners for radioactive or hazardous waste liquid	
 As liners for secondary containment of underground storage tanks
 As liners for solar ponds
 As liners for brine solutions
 As liners for the agriculture industry
 As liners for the aquiculture industry, such as fish/shrimp pond
 As liners for golf course water holes and sand bunkers
 As liners for all types of decorative and architectural ponds	
 As liners for water conveyance canals
 As liners for various waste conveyance canals
 As liners for primary, secondary, and/or tertiary solid-waste landfills and waste piles
 As liners for heap leach pads
 As covers (caps) for solid-waste landfills
 As covers for aerobic and anaerobic manure digesters in the agriculture industry
 As covers for power plant coal ash
 As liners for vertical walls:  single or double with leak detection
 As cutoffs within zoned earth dams for seepage control
 As linings for emergency spillways
 As waterproofing liners within tunnels and pipelines
 As waterproof facing of earth and rockfill dams
 As waterproof facing for roller compacted concrete dams
 As waterproof facing for masonry and concrete dams
 Within cofferdams for seepage control
 As floating reservoirs for seepage control
 As floating reservoir covers for preventing pollution
 To contain and transport liquids in trucks
 To contain and transport potable water and other liquids in the ocean
 As a barrier to odors from landfills
 As a barrier to vapors (radon, hydrocarbons, etc.) beneath buildings
 To control expansive soils
 To control frost-susceptible soils
 To shield sinkhole-susceptible areas from flowing water
 To prevent infiltration of water in sensitive areas
 To form barrier tubes as dams
 To face structural supports as temporary cofferdams
 To conduct water flow into preferred paths
 Beneath highways to prevent pollution from deicing salts
 Beneath and adjacent to highways to capture hazardous liquid spills
 As containment structures for temporary surcharges
 To aid in establishing uniformity of subsurface compressibility and subsidence
 Beneath asphalt overlays as a waterproofing layer
 To contain seepage losses in existing above-ground tanks
 As flexible forms where loss of material cannot be allowed.

See also
Electrical liner integrity survey

References

Further reading

 ICOLD Bulletin 135, Geomembrane Sealing Systems for Dams, 2010, Paris, France, 464 pgs.
 August, H., Holzlöhne, U. and Meggys, T. (1997), Advanced Landfill Liner Systems, Thomas Telford Publ., London, 389 pgs.
 Kays, W. B. (1987), Construction of Linings for Reservoirs, Tanks and Pollution Control Foundation, J. Wiley and Sons, New York, NY, 379 pgs.
 Rollin, A. and Rigo, J. M. (1991), Geomembranes: Identification and Performance Testing, Chapman and Hall Publ., London, 355 pgs.
 Müller, W. (2007), HDPE Geomembranes in Geotechnics, Springer-Verlag Publ., Berlin, 485 pgs.
 Sharma, H. D. and Lewis, S. P. (1994), Waste Containment Systems, Waste Stabilization and Landfills, J. Wiley and Sons, New York, NY, 586 pgs.

Geosynthetics
Building materials
Landfill